François-Nicholas-Madeleine Morlot (28 December 1795 – 29 December 1862) was a French prelate of the Catholic Church. He was Archbishop of Paris from 1857 until his death. He was previously Bishop of Orléans from 1839 and then Archbishop of Tours from 1843.

Life
Morlot was born in Langres was he began his studies before pursuing theological studies in Dijon. As he had not yet reached the required age for ordination, he worked for a time as a private tutor before becoming a priest. He was ordained in 1820.

Morlot served as vicar of the Cathedral of Saint Benignus of Dijon and in 1825 became vicar general of the Diocese of Dijon. In 1831, Claude Rey was named Bishop of Dijon, but as he had been appointed by the king, it was not received well by the diocesan clergy, including Morlot. Morlot resigned as vicar general and accepted an appointment as a cathedral canon. Morlot eventually penned a Remonstrance critical of the bishop exercising his public functions, and which contributed to Rey's resignation in 1838. Morlot was then again re-appointed vicar general.

Bishop
In March 1839, Morlot was made Bishop of Orléans. He was consecrated bishop August 18, 1839, in the chapel of the Dames du Sacré Coeur, Paris, by Charles de Forbin-Janson, bishop of Nancy et Toul.

King Louis Philippe I took the occasion of the christening of his grandson, Prince Philippe, comte de Paris, to recognize Morlot's valuables services and  awarded him the Legion of Honour. In January 1843, Morlot was named Archbishop of Tours.

Pope Pius IX named him a cardinal in March 1853, and as such he took a seat in the senate of the Second French Empire. In June that year he was given the titular church of Santi Nereo e Achilleo. In January 1857, he was appointed to succeed the assassinated Marie-Dominique-Auguste Sibour as Archbishop of Paris.
Morlot died on 29 December 1862 in Paris and was interred in the cathedral Notre-Dame de Paris.

References

1795 births
1862 deaths
People from Langres
19th-century French cardinals
Cardinals created by Pope Pius IX
Bishops of Orléans
Archbishops of Paris
Archbishops of Tours
Grand Officiers of the Légion d'honneur
Burials at Notre-Dame de Paris